USS McCawley (DD-276) was a  built for the United States Navy during World WarI. She was armed with 4× 4inch and 2× 1pounder guns. She was commissioned on 22September 1919, served with the Pacific Fleet for 3 years and was laid up on 7June 1922. McCawley was recommissioned on 27September 1923, again serving in the Pacific, and decommissioned in 1930 before being sold for scrap.

Description
The Clemson class was a repeat of the preceding  although more fuel capacity was added. They had a crew of 6 officers and 108 enlisted men.

Performance differed radically between the ships of the class, often due to poor workmanship. The Clemson class was powered by two steam turbines, each driving one propeller shaft, using steam provided by four water-tube boilers.

The ships were armed with four 4-inch (102 mm) guns in single mounts and were fitted with two  1-pounder guns for anti-aircraft defense. In many ships a shortage of 1-pounders caused them to be replaced by 3-inch (76 mm) guns. Their primary weapon, though, was their torpedo battery of a dozen 21 inch (533 mm) torpedo tubes in four triple mounts. They also carried a pair of depth charge rails. A "Y-gun" depth charge thrower was added to many ships.

Commissioning
McCawley, named for Colonel Charles McCawley, was laid down 5 November 1918 by the Bethlehem Shipbuilding Corporation's Fore River Shipyard in Quincy, Massachusetts; launched 14 June 1919; sponsored by Miss Eleanor Laurie McCawley, granddaughter of Colonel McCawley; and commissioned 22 September 1919.

Service history
Following an east coast fitting out and shakedown period, McCawley sailed for San Diego, California where she joined Destroyer Squadron 2, later DesRon 4, Pacific Fleet. She participated in local exercises off the west coast until she decommissioned at San Diego 7June 1922.

On 27September 1923 McCawley was recommissioned and again assigned to the Pacific Fleet. For the next 6 years she operated there, taking part in various local, squadron and fleet training exercises. During 1924 and 1927 she steamed to the Caribbean for fleet problems, but otherwise spent the entire period in operations along the west coast, from San Diego to Puget Sound, and in Hawaiian waters.

McCawley was designated for deactivation under the terms of the London Treaty for the Limitation of Naval Armament and decommissioned at San Diego  on 1 April 1930. Her name was struck from the Navy list on 13 August 1930 and her hulk was scrapped and sold at auction 2 September 1931.

Notes

References

External links
http://www.navsource.org/archives/05/276.htm

 

Clemson-class destroyers
Ships built in Quincy, Massachusetts
1919 ships